The 1999–2000 Hellenic Football League season was the 47th in the history of the Hellenic Football League, a football competition in England.

At the end of the season the Hellenic League merged with the Chiltonian League. 17 clubs from the latter formed Division One East, while Hellenic League Division One clubs formed Division One West.

Premier Division

The Premier Division featured 16 clubs which competed in the division last season, along with three new clubs:
Brackley Town, relegated from the Southern Football League
Milton United, promoted from Division One
Pegasus Juniors, promoted from Division One

League table

Division One

Division One featured 13 clubs which competed in Division One last season, along with two new clubs, joined from the Oxfordshire Senior League:
Middle Barton
Old Woodstock Town

League table

References

External links
 Hellenic Football League

1999-2000
8